Universiti is a light rapid transit (LRT) station in Kuala Lumpur served by the Kelana Jaya Line. This station serves the local population of University of Malaya and neighbouring Bangsar South, Pantai Dalam and Pantai Hill Park.

Station naming rights program

The station was renamed to KL Gateway–Universiti after Suez Capital, a local property development was given naming rights by Prasarana Malaysia. KL Gateway is the major redevelopment of Kampung Kerinchi into premium residential, shopping mall & office tower.

It is the first three stations under pilot program of Station Naming Rights since launched in October 2015. Nonetheless, the contract presumed to be terminated in 2021 as all the signages which carry KL Gateway title were removed from the station. Announcements for the sponsorship on trains were also removed as of March 2022.

Gallery

References 

Kelana Jaya Line
Railway stations opened in 1998
University of Malaya
Railway stations at university and college campuses